The 1974 Scottish League Cup final was played on 26 October 1974 and was the final of the 29th Scottish League Cup competition. It was contested by Hibernian and Celtic. Celtic won the match 6–3, with John "Dixie" Deans and Joe Harper scoring hat-tricks for each side. Jimmy Johnstone, Steve Murray and Paul Wilson scored Celtic's other goals.

Match details

Media coverage 
In Scotland highlights of the final were shown on BBC One Scotland on their Sportsreel programme in the evening and also on STV and Grampian Television on the former's Scotsport programme the following day.

See also
Other League Cup finals played between the same clubs:
 1969 Scottish League Cup final (April)
 1972 Scottish League Cup final
 2021 Scottish League Cup final (December)

References

External links 
 Soccerbase

1974
League Cup Final
Scottish League Cup Final 1974
Scottish League Cup Final 1974
20th century in Glasgow